The 1979 FIFA World Youth Championship Final was a football match that was played on at the National Stadium, Tokyo, Japan on 7 September 1979 to determine the champions of the 1979 FIFA World Youth Championship. The final was contested by Argentina and the Soviet Union. Argentina won the match 3–1, winning the title for the first time.

Argentine raising superstar Diego Maradona, who scored a goal, was named the best player of the competition.

Background

Argentina had won its first FIFA World Cup just one year before. César Luis Menotti, who had managed the senior squad that crowned champion in Argentina, coached the team. Ernesto Duchini –who was part of the coaching staff to discover new talents around the country– had selected the players that were then under the guidance of Menotti to win the title.

Duchini had been in charge of Argentine youth teams since 1954, and was a cornerstone of the coaching staff that led that group of players to achieve their first title. Some of the players discovered by Duchini were Roberto Perfumo, Carlos García Cambón, Oscar Más, Rubén Ayala, Oscar Ortíz, Jorge Olguín, Raúl Savoy, among others.

Duchini worked side-by-side with Miguel Gitano Juárez, former player of Rosario Central and very close to Menotti. Juárez suggested some players for the youth team, such as Juan Simón, Rubén Rossi, Rafael Seria and Daniel Sperandío, all of them playing in Rosario-based clubs.

The players selected to play the tournament were goalkeepers Sergio García (Flandria) and Rafael Seria (Central Córdoba); defenders Juan Simón (Newell's), Rubén Rossi (Colón), Abelardo Carabelli (Argentinos Juniors), Hugo Alves (Boca Juniors), Marcelo Bachino (Boca Juniors), Jorge Piaggio (Atlanta); midfielders Daniel Sperandío (Rosario Central), Juan Barbas (Racing), Osvaldo Rinaldi (San Lorenzo), Juan José Meza (Central Norte de Tucumán); Diego Maradona (Argentinos Juniors); forwards Osvaldo Escudero (Chacarita), Alfredo Torres (Atlanta), Ramón Díaz (River Plate), Gabriel Calderón (Racing), José Luis Lanao (Vélez).

Diego Maradona was the playmaker and leader of that team. His performance in the competition was so stunning that was awarded the Golden Ball as the best player of the tournament. He also won the Silver Boot as the second topscorer behind teammate Ramón Díaz.

Road to the final

Match details 

Sources: 
FIFA (Argentina squad)
FIFA (Soviet Union squad)

Aftermath 

The second world title within two years were widely celebrated by people throughout the country, as they had done the previous year after the win against the Netherlands.

The media also praised the team's style of play, attributed to Menotti's philosophy toward the game.

Beyond the great performance of the team in general, media focused on the performances of Argentinos Juniors' star Diego Maradona (highlighting his control of the ball, passing and dribbling) and Ramón Díaz's scoring prowess at the tournament.

At their returning from Japan, the players were carried in helicopter to the Atlanta stadium, where the flagship landed on the field as part of the celebrations for the championship won in Tokyo.

See also
 1979 FIFA World Youth Championship

References

FIFA World Youth Championship finals
1979
1979
International association football competitions hosted by Japan
1979 in Japanese football
September 1979 sports events in Asia